Derrick Barnes may refer to:

Derrick Barnes (author), American author
Derrick Barnes (American football) (born 1999), American football linebacker